Nicole Graf (born 7 May 1985 in Wil, Switzerland) is a Swiss figure skater who competes in ladies singles.  She won the gold medal at the 2009 Swiss Figure Skating Championships and finished 26th at the European Figure Skating Championships that year.  In 2012, she captured the bronze medal at the Swiss Nationals.

References
 

Swiss female single skaters
1985 births
Living people
Competitors at the 2009 Winter Universiade
Competitors at the 2013 Winter Universiade
People from Wil